Kotidanga Rural LLG is a local-level government (LLG) of Gulf Province, Papua New Guinea.

Wards
01. Kanabea
02. Ipaiyu
03. Manimango
04. Wemawa
05. Komako
06. Kwaiyu
07. Bu'u
08. Pio (Tainae language] speakers)
09. Ania (Tainae language] speakers)
10. Aminauwa
11. M'bauya
12. Ivandu
13. Hawakabia
14. Kamina
15. Tiawa
16. Paina
17. Meiwari
18. Kutumbaiwa
19. Kotidanga
20. Ipaea

References

Local-level governments of Gulf Province